The Starless Sea is a 2019 speculative fiction novel by Erin Morgenstern. It is her second book, following the best-selling The Night Circus, which was published in 2011. The novel reached number three on The New York Times Best Seller list, and was also a Los Angeles Times and Sunday Times bestseller.

Plot synopsis 
The Starless Sea does not have a linear plot, but rather is a pastiche of a modern narrative, folk tales, mysterious biographical snippets, stories within stories within stories, and the made-up history of the fantastical world within which it takes place, all interlocking and intertwining.

The modern narrative follows Zachary Ezra Rawlins, who is a graduate student at a New England university. One day he finds in the library a book called Sweet Sorrows with no author or publication information, and is amazed to discover that among its fairy tales and textual snippets, it also tells stories about him, and especially of an incident when he was a child, and came across a magical door. Afraid to discover magic isn't real, he demurred to go through it. Sweet Sorrows, however, describes the magical library on the other side of the door, and the Starless Sea upon which it sits.

Zachary sets out on a quest to find out more, and finds a literary masquerade ball in Manhattan, where he meets two other characters central to the book: Mirabel, who he later discovers is a denizen of the magical underground world upon the Starless Sea, and Dorian. Dorian steals Sweet Sorrows from Zachary, and blackmails him into breaking into the premises of a secret Guardian society to retrieve a book that he, Dorian, requires. This mission and the action that ensues end up with Mirabel saving Zachary and taking him though a doorway in a park. Here, Zachary first encounters the magical realm he read about earlier, and meets The Keeper, who is in charge of the sanctuary they all reside in while there, and Rhyme, an acolyte in charge of the library and its books.

Though Mirabel is clearly pushing Zachary forward to some objective, she is not forthcoming about what it is or how to get there. Zachary continues to be swept along on currents of stories and characters, along the way also managing to save Dorian from the clutches of Allegra, the leader of the Guardians. While Allegra claims she is actually protecting the library, Mirabel and the Keeper, who live within it, see her as an enemy, and indeed Allegra proves herself capable of any evil act imaginable in the pursuit of her – also murky – goals. Dorian and Zachary are quickly becoming a potential love match, but they find themselves torn apart by the weird and mysterious events of the underground world.

Each of them encounters figures from previous biographical tales as well as fables, and these encounters eventually bring the various and seemingly unconnected story strands to their fateful and fabulistic close.

Characters 
 Zachary Ezra Rawlins: Also referred to as "The fortune teller's son." Zachary is a graduate student specializing in video game narratives. After finding a mysterious library book that depicts a moment from his childhood, Zachary is drawn into the fantastical world of the underground Starless Sea and its harbors that contain every story ever told.
 Mirabel: A mysterious woman Zachary meets at a party he attends upon his quest to find the Starless Sea. Mirabel turns out to be a native of the sanctuary on the harbor of the Starless Sea, and drags Zachary through labrynthine plots to achieve an end game that only she knowns. 
 Dorian: A mysterious man formerly associated with the Collector's Club, an organization that seeks to destroy all doors to the Starless Sea. His fate is soon entwined with Zachary's, as the two are thrust into the forefront of an unfolding story in a quest to save the Starless Sea and each other.
 The Keeper: The caretaker of the heart of the Starless Sea's harbor. An ageless being who appears to have resided within the sanctuary for an eternity.
 Allegra: Leader of the Collector's Club. A powerful woman who will stop at nothing to achieve what she believes is right.
 Eleanor: A girl from a book. She fell into the harbor when she was a young girl and grew up there. An adventurer who encounters a man from a different time.
 Simon: A young man from a time past. He is gifted a door to the Starless Sea. Meets a girl in a room outside time.
 The Innkeeper and the Moon: Two lovers from a story. A story that may hold more truth than myth.
 Rhyme: The last acolyte of the library, who sacrificed her ability to speak.
 Kat: Zachary's friend from college. An eccentric young woman who also studies game narratives. She endeavors to uncover the truth of Zachary's disappearance.

Reception 
Describing the plot as requiring readers to have great tolerance for meta moments, Leigha McReynolds, reviewing for LA Review of Books, says: "If you want someone to tell you a straightforward story, this novel is not going to deliver. And the narrative ambition of the text deserves to be recognized and rewarded." While recognizing the many rewarding moments within the complex narrative, McReynolds ultimately concludes that the payoff was lacking, asserting that the many connections failed to add up to a cohesive narrative with a clear message.

The Guardian review by Natasha Pulley describes The Starless Sea as a novel that rejects traditions and conventions of world building; a that rejects older stories to make up its own. Pulley describes the myriad images, snippets of backstories, and tales within tales as "assuredly beautiful", but recognizes that "there is no logic that binds these lovely set piece tableaux. Nobody explains why the Starless Sea is honey, or how a honey sea isn’t full of dead flies. The novel reads like panel after panel of mythic illustrations: it expects a certain acceptance of unlikely images". She writes that some readers might find this approach infuriating, while asserting that this is because it challenges deep-seated conventions of the fantasy genre. She further maintains that The Starless Sea demands to be read on its own terms, not those set in those different times and places readers have come to recognize: "Rather than a traditional fantasy novel, this is an artificial myth in its own right, soldered together from the girders of skyscrapers – a myth from and for the US, rather than inherited from older nations. Like any myth, it refuses to decode its own symbols. A reader might find this deliberate vagueness either uplifting or maddening, but the novel’s scope and ambition are undeniable."

Lyndsay Faye, in her New York Times book review, finds the pastiche that is The Starless Sea to be unrewarding. She doesn't find the main character compelling, but does praise Morgenstern's style, which "especially in the frequent Grimm-esque interludes, employs aggressively simple children’s literature syntax to describe outlandish settings that are either opulent or decaying. Her skill at rendering these spaces is remarkable, the smells of smoke and honey wafting through stone corridors and nameless cats slinking along secret passageways.... But a cigar is never just a cigar, and it’s impossible to settle in without being bludgeoned by mystique." But she finds the crippled by "numbingly vague expostulation" and "pseudo-philosophical sentences". Faye concludes: "The Starless Sea flounders as a novel. As an ode to an aesthetic, however, it is marvelous, rife with stags carrying lit candles on their antlers, fallen cherry blossoms and story-sculptors who put their chronicles in clouds. 'I’m not sure I’m following the metaphors anymore,' Zachary objects. He won’t be alone. But for those swept away by the romance of its imagery, The Starless Sea will provide hours of honey-drenched bliss."

Kirkus' enthusiastic review calls The Starless Sea "an ambitious and bewitching gem of a book with mystery and passion inscribed on every page," and Adrienne Martini, in Locus Magazine, describes how "Morgenstern takes great glee in subverting expectations for what a story needs to contain in this, um, story," explaining that the difficulty in describing or following the novel's plot narrative is because The Starless Sea is less about the narrative plot, and more about the philosophical underpinnings of stories themselves. She concludes that "Like any story, The Starless Sea has a beginning and an ending. It also has a middle – a lot of middle. Morgenstern crams about a billion ideas – including but not limited to game design, folk tales, cocktails, and bees – into the endless-feeling middle. Some of them open up her tale in interesting ways; some don’t live up to their promises. She takes a big, admirable swing but doesn’t completely connect. Still, it’s a book full of beautiful moments, even if they don’t all work in concert."

Amal El-Mohtar, however, writes for NPR that The Starless Sea made her feel like "a child falling into a story again," finding the narrative twists and turns exciting, and making her feel like she was "playing a puzzle game, being guided through a beautiful labyrinth of harbours and honey and bees." Because of this regard for the conceptual, she is disappointed by the more conventional villain-driven narrative that develops later in the book, taking it to its denouement. Her overall review, however, is unabashedly positive: "What did work for me, deeply and wholesomely and movingly, was the whole affect of the book, its warmth, its helpless love of storytelling and beautiful, polished fables. It's a book that's a pleasure to dwell in, a delicious experience to dip in and out of.... When I finished it, I was uncertain of my thoughts about the whole; the next night, when I realized there was nothing left of it to read, I felt lost and sad."

Awards 

 Dragon Award for Best Fantasy Novel (2020)
Locus Award nominee for Best Fantasy Novel (2020)
 Goodreads Choice Award nominee for Fantasy (2019)

References

External links 

 The Starless Sea on the author's official website

2019 American novels
2019 LGBT-related literary works
American fantasy novels
Doubleday (publisher) books
Novels set in New York City
Novels set in Vermont
2010s LGBT novels
Harvill Secker books